The 2015 Codasur South American Rally Championship is an international rally championship sanctioned by the FIA and run by the Confederacion Deportiva Automovilismo Sudamericana (Codasur). The championship was contested over five events held in five South American countries from April to November.

Event calendar and results

The 2015 Codasur South American Rally Championship was as follows:

Championship standings
The 2015 Codasur South American Rally Championship points were as follows:

References

External links

Codasur South American Rally Championship
Codasur South America
Codasur South American Rally Championship